Max M. Sandfield (January 28, 1903 – April 12, 1994) was an architect, sculptor, and artist.

Life
Born in the Russian Empire, Sandfield immigrated to the United States as an infant and was raised in San Antonio. He graduated from MIT in 1925 with a bachelor's degree in architecture. In April 1944 he met Carol Wiener, whom he married three months later. They had five children together: Norman, Joan, Robert, Carol Lynn and Byron.

Architecture
Sandfield was part of a team of architects in Dallas, including Howard R. Meyer and William W. Wurster, that built Temple Emanu-el in 1957. The synagogue was recognized by the American Institute of Architects with a Twenty-five Year Award for its enduring merit. Sandfield for a time was president of the Dallas Chapter of AIA.

References

1903 births
1994 deaths
Architects from Texas
20th-century American architects
Emigrants from the Russian Empire to the United States